Hermenegildo Teves Villanueva (September 25, 1876 – December 17, 1941), fondly called Bindoy, was a Filipino politician. He served as Secretary of Labor for Manuel L. Quezon from December 1938 until his resignation in April 1939.

Personal life
Villanueva was born on the 25th of September, 1876 in Bais, Negros Oriental, one of the 11 children of Hermenegildo Regis Villanueva and Anselma Pinili Teves. He was privately tutored for primary education and finished secondary and tertiary education in Cebu. Upon finishing his studies, the Spanish–American War erupted and he became one of the leaders in the Negros Revolution.

He was married to  Asuncion Larena, daughter of Don Demetrio Larena and Maria Luisa de la Peña of Zamboanguita. They had one son, Jesus Pablo Villanueva. He also partnered with Nemecia Diputado and had 5 children.

As a sugar planter and progressive agriculturist, he was a long-time member of the board of directors of Central Azucarera de Bais y Tanjay founded by Tabacalera. He was also instrumental in the creation of the Sugar Central Board, forerunner of the present Sugar Regulatory Administration.

Political career
After the Spanish–American War, he was appointed as justice of the peace in Bais. In 1902, he became municipal vice-president (vice mayor) and subsequently elected as municipal president (mayor) in 1903. He was reelected for another term in 1905.

In 1907, he succeeded Demetrio Larena as governor of Negros Oriental. In 1909, while serving an unexpired term as governor, he ran for a seat in the Philippine Assembly and won. He represented the first district of Negros Oriental for two consecutive terms from 1909 to 1912 and from 1912 to 1916.

Villanueva then served as senator from the eighth senatorial district for two terms from 1919 to 1925 and from 1925 to 1931. Afterwards, he returned as governor of Negros Oriental for another two terms from 1931 to 1934 and from 1934 to 1937. During his incumbency as governor, he was elected as delegate to the 1934 Constitutional Convention that drafted the 1935 Philippine Constitution and was chairman of the Committees on National Defense, Special Provinces, and Sponsorship.

Prior to his appointment to the Quezon cabinet, he was appointed Chairman of the Board on Pension for Veterans in 1938.

Death and legacy
Villanueva was aboard SS Corregidor when it sank in the early hours of December 17, 1941 upon striking a mine off Manila Bay. His son Jesus Pablo Villanueva also died as a result of the tragedy.

In 1949, as decreed by President Elpidio Quirino, the barrio of Payabon was separated from the town of Manjuyod, Negros Oriental and created as the town of Bindoy, named after Villanueva.

References

External links
Senate of the Philippines - Biography of Hermenegildo Villanueva

1876 births
1941 deaths
Governors of Negros Oriental
Senators of the 8th Philippine Legislature
Senators of the 7th Philippine Legislature
Senators of the 6th Philippine Legislature
Senators of the 5th Philippine Legislature
Members of the House of Representatives of the Philippines from Negros Oriental
People from Negros Oriental